Panteón Zapopan Centro is a cemetery in Zapopan, in the Mexican state of Jalisco.

It is the resting place of actor Georges Renavent (1894–1969), who died in Guadalajara.

References

External links

 
 

Cemeteries in Mexico
Zapopan